WTBF may refer to:

 WTBF (AM), a radio station (970 AM) licensed to Troy, Alabama, United States
 WTBF-FM, a radio station (94.7 FM) licensed to Brundidge, Alabama, United States